Sharks Tooth is a small steep-sided, tooth-like rock lying west of Beckett Nunatak at the north side of the upper Mawson Glacier in Oates Land. Mapped and named by the Southern Party of the New Zealand Geological Survey Antarctic Expedition (NZGSAE), 1962–63.

Rock formations of Oates Land